Marcel Chuavin (born 26 Apr, 1914 in Couëron) was a French clergyman and auxiliary bishop for the Roman Catholic Diocese of Fada N'Gourma. He became ordained in 1939. He was appointed bishop in 1964. He died in 2004.

References

1914 births
French Roman Catholic bishops in Africa
2004 deaths
French expatriates in Burkina Faso
Roman Catholic bishops of Fada N'Gourma